Lombard College was a Universalist college located in Galesburg, Illinois.

History
Lombard College was founded in 1853 by the Universalist Church as the Illinois Liberal Institute.  In 1855, however, a major fire damaged much of the college, placing its future at risk, but a large gift from Benjamin Lombard  (1815–1882), a Massachusetts-born farmer and businessman, rescued the institution, rechristened as Lombard University.  The official name of the school was changed to Lombard College.

Lombard was coeducational from its founding, reflecting the Universalist philosophy.  The institution was the seat of the Ryder School of Divinity from sometime in the 1880s until 1913.  The very first chapter of the national sorority Alpha Xi Delta was also founded there in 1893.

Lombard College was a member of the Illinois Intercollegiate Athletic Conference from 1910 to 1929.

The Great Depression proved to be too much for Lombard; the last class was graduated in 1930.  While Lombard did not merge, some of its students transferred to nearby Knox College, and its alumni activities take place at Knox. Sigma Nu fraternity's Delta Theta chapter, which formed at Lombard in 1867 as the Delta Theta Society and became a part of Sigma Nu in 1891, continues its activities at Knox to this day. Until 1973, the Alpha Chapter of Alpha Xi Delta also continued at Knox.

The former Lombard College building and campus is currently used as Lombard Middle School.

When the college closed in 1930, the Lombard charter was transferred to Meadville Theological School in Chicago. a Unitarian seminary, bringing with it Lombard's privilege of a tax exemption, "one of only three in Illinois granting full tax-exempt status in perpetuity for all college-owned property." In 1964 the school adopted the name "Meadville Theological School of Lombard College". The combined institution later became Meadville Lombard Theological School.

Notable alumni
Ken Carpenter - radio-TV announcer
Edwin H. Conger – U.S. Congressman, diplomat, and Minister to Brazil, China, and Mexico
Jennie Florella Holmes — American temperance activist and suffragist
Effie McCollum Jones - Universalist minister, suffragist
William Bramwell Powell - educator, co-founder of National Geographic Society
Carl Sandburg (non-graduate) – author, poet, Pulitzer Prize winner
Paul Jordan Smith – editor, educator, poet
Evar Swanson – professional baseball and football player
Vespasian Warner –  politician, lawyer, businessman.
Owen B. West - Illinois state legislator, farmer, and businessman
Sewall G. Wright – geneticist
Quincy Wright – educator, poet, economist
Theodore Paul Wright – engineer, first director of the Civil Aeronautics Administration

Notable faculty
Anna Groff Bryant — vocal teacher, head of music department
Philip Green Wright
David Starr Jordan – ichthyologist, president of Indiana University; founding president of Stanford University
Frederick William Rich-Dean of the College of Liberal Arts, Conger Professor of Chemistry and Physics [Catalogue of Lombard College, 1906-1908]
Wilhelmine Key - geneticist, eugenics

References

External links

Lombard history
The Lombard College Collection at Knox College

 
Educational institutions established in 1853
Defunct private universities and colleges in Illinois
Educational institutions disestablished in 1930
Education in Knox County, Illinois
Universities and colleges affiliated with the Universalist Church of America
1853 establishments in Illinois
1930 disestablishments in Illinois